, son of regent Nijō Korefusa, was a Japanese kugyō (court noble) of the Muromachi period (1336–1573). He held a regent position kampaku two times from 1548 to 1553 and from 1568 to 1578. He married a daughter of prince Fushimi-no-miya Sadaatsu who gave birth to Kujō Kanetaka, Nijō Akizane and Takatsukasa Nobufusa.

References

Fujiwara clan
Nijō family
1526 births
1579 deaths